The Fox Uptown Theatre was located at 1008 S. Western Avenue in Los Angeles.

History
It opened on December 29, 1925, and the first movie was Graustark with Norma Talmadge. It was equipped with a Wurlitzer organ. It was built and operated by the West Coast Theatres chain and had a large rooftop sign. It had 1,715 seats and was acquired by the Fox West Coast Theatres chain.

When it closed on October 23, 1959, it was operated by National General Theatres.  The last movie was Vincent Price in The Tingler. It was demolished several years later to build a Ralphs store. Currently an indoor mall now stands on the site today.

References

Demolished theatres in Los Angeles
Former cinemas in the United States
Theatres in Los Angeles